Claypot rice, sometimes translated as "rice casserole", is a Chinese traditional dinner eaten widely in Guangdong in Southern China as well as the Chinese communities of Malaysia, Indonesia, Singapore and Thailand. 

The rice is presoaked, or in some cases par-cooked, and finished in the claypot with other ingredients which then flavor the rice. The rice develops a crust similar to that in Korean dolsot bibimbap or Iranian “tahdig” and Spanish paella. It is commonly served with chicken, Chinese sausage and vegetables in some regions, but most restaurants offer a customizable dish with many protein options. 

Traditionally, the cooking is done over a charcoal stove, giving the dish a distinctive flavour. Some places serve it with thick, sweetened soy sauce and sometimes dried salted fish. Due to the time-consuming method of preparation and slow-cooking in a claypot, customers may have to wait a period of time (typically 15–30 minutes) before the dish is ready.

Gallery

See also

 Clay pot cooking
 Dolsot bibimbap
 Sapo tahu
 List of rice dishes

References

Singaporean rice dishes
Chinese rice dishes
Chicken and rice dishes
Sausage dishes